The northern water rat (Paraleptomys rufilatus) is an endangered species of rodent in the family Muridae found in the highlands of New Guinea.

Distribution
The northern water rat is a rodent of the genus Paraleptomys appearing on New Guinea. This species has a small, fragmented distribution and is probably quite rare. They are probably partly active during the day. By Olo (the local tribe on Mount Somoro in Sandaun Province), this animal is referred to as "timbri".

Description
P. rufilatus is larger than the other species of the genus, P. wilhelmina, and is less uniform in colour; the throat is white and the flanks are orange-like, while both body parts are brown in P. wilhelmina.

References

Paraleptomys
Rodents of Papua New Guinea
Mammals of Western New Guinea
Mammals described in 1945
Taxonomy articles created by Polbot
Rodents of New Guinea
Taxa named by Wilfred Hudson Osgood